Monarto may refer to:

Monarto, South Australia, a locality
Monarto Safari Park, a large open-range zoo in South Australia 
Monarto Conservation Park,  a protected area in South Australia 
 City of Monarto, a proposed city in South Australia in the 1970s - see Monarto, South Australia#Proposed city of Monarto
District Council of Monarto, a former local government area that occupied the extent of Hundred of Monarto
Hundred of Monarto, a cadastral unit

See also
Monarto South, South Australia
Monarto Woodlands Conservation Park
Monarto South railway station
Monaro (disambiguation)